Jyothi Engineering College is a private engineering college situated in Cheruthuruthy, Chelakkara Thrissur District of Kerala, India. The college is run by Syro-Malabar Catholic Archdiocese of Thrissur. The college is affiliated to All India Council for Technical Education (AICTE) New Delhi, Kerala Technological University (KTU), and the University of Calicut.

B Tech Programs 
Jyothi Engineering College (JEC) offers B Tech programs in the following disciplines under KTU:

NBA & NAAC Accreditations 
Jyothi Engineering College (JEC) has 5 NBA accredited B Tech programs (valid for 3 years from academic year 2016-2017 to 2018-2019). They are being re-accredited by NBA for 3 more academic years from 2019-2020 to 2021-2022. The NBA accredited B Tech programs are:

 Civil Engineering
 Computer Science Engineering
 Electronics and Communications Engineering
 Electrical and Electronics Engineering
 Mechanical Engineering

JEC is also NAAC accredited with A grade and valid up to 25/04/2027.

M Tech Programs 
JEC offers the following M Tech programs:

PhD Programs 
JEC is an approved PhD research centre under APJ Abdul Kalam University. JEC has accepted PhD students in Electronics and Communications Engineering, and Electrical and Electronics Engineering.

References

External links

 Tharang 2017 | Techfest, Jyothi Engineering college.
 Innovation & Entrepreneurship Development Cell of Jyothi Engineering College.

Engineering colleges in Thrissur district
All India Council for Technical Education
Colleges affiliated with the University of Calicut
Catholic universities and colleges in India